"Bad Amanda" is the tenth episode in the third season, the 51st episode overall, of the American dramedy series Ugly Betty, which aired on December 4, 2008. The episode was written by Chris Black and directed by John Putch.

Plot
Amanda and Betty are forced to work together for an article called "How I Blew Ten Grand Without Spending a Dime". However, they end up being robbed of their apartment rent, causing Amanda and Betty to fight about it. Wilhelmina continues to have a crush on Connor, and tries to avoid him at first but finally admits that she wants to spend the rest of her life with Connor. Daniel tries his best to avoid any feelings towards Molly after Claire advises him that he will be heartbroken as Connor is still Molly's fiance but when he almost kisses her, Wilhelmina grabs the tape.

Production
This episode's production number was originally listed as 311 (Season 3, episode 11), but was renumbered due to an error.

Reception

In Entertainment Weekly's review, Tanner Stransky was excited to see Ashley Jensen get some screen time and called the episode "Good stuff!"

Ratings
The episode scored a 5.8/9 rating overall, with a 2.6/7 in 18-49s and 8.47 million viewers (roughly up by 200,000 more viewers from the previous showing) tuning in.

References

Also starring
Grant Bowler as Connor Owens
Sarah Lafleur as Molly

Guest starring
Toks Olagundoye as the salesgirl 
Aaron Lazar as Claudio
Mercer Boffey as Luka
Matt Wilkas as the manager 
Nicole Roderick as the temp
Kate Miller as the restaurant owner

See also
 Ugly Betty
 Ugly Betty (season 3)

Ugly Betty (season 3) episodes
2008 American television episodes